Maize South High School is a fully accredited public high school in Wichita, Kansas, operated by Maize USD 266 school district, and serves students in grades 9–12. Maize South High School is one of two high schools in the Maize School District.  The official school colors are vegas gold, black, and white. Annual enrollment numbers are approximately 1,100 students.  Maize South competes as the Mavericks in the 5A classification of the Kansas State High School Activities Association.

History
Maize South High School was built in 2009 due to overcrowding at nearby Maize High School. Since its opening, the two schools have formed a rivalry and continue to compete annually.

Athletics
The athletic programs at Maize South are known as the "Mavericks" and compete at the 5A level.

State Championships

See also
 List of high schools in Kansas
 List of unified school districts in Kansas
Other high schools in Maize USD 266 school district
 Maize High School in Maize

References

External links
 School website
 USD 266 school district website

Public high schools in Kansas
Schools in Sedgwick County, Kansas
2009 establishments in Kansas